Hölzel is a surname. Notable people with the surname include:

 Adolf Hölzel (1853–1934), German artist and painter
 Gustav Hölzel (1813–1883), Austro-Hungarian bass-baritone and composer
 Johann Hölzel (1957–1998), stage name Falco, Austrian singer, musician, and songwriter